Rhagium iranum is a species of beetle in the family Cerambycidae. It was described by Heller in 1924.

References

Lepturinae
Beetles described in 1924